Rueppel's big-eyed tree frog (Ranoidea rueppelli) is a species of frog in the subfamily Pelodryadinae. It is endemic to Indonesia. Its natural habitats are subtropical or tropical moist lowland forests, subtropical or tropical moist montane forests, and rivers. It is threatened by habitat loss.

References
 

Ranoidea (genus)
Amphibians described in 1895
Taxonomy articles created by Polbot
Taxobox binomials not recognized by IUCN